Joseph John Castiglione (born March 2, 1947) is an American radio announcer for the Boston Red Sox baseball team, an author and lecturer.

Early life and career
Castiglione was born in Hamden, Connecticut, and graduated from Colgate University with a BA in Liberal Arts. He was the radio voice of Colgate football and baseball while a student. He then received an MA in radio/TV from Syracuse University's S. I. Newhouse School of Public Communications in 1970. He also worked on the WAER-FM staff at SU. While at Syracuse, he worked a variety of on-air jobs for WSYR-TV (now WSTM-TV). He began his career in Youngstown, Ohio, broadcasting football games for $15 a game, and as sports reporter for WFMJ-TV in 1972.

Castiglione states that he was a New York Yankees fan as a kid, then closely followed the Pittsburgh Pirates because they were the closest to Youngstown, and likewise became an Indians fan after moving to Cleveland. His first major job as a sportscaster was in Cleveland in 1979, where he called Cleveland Indians and Cleveland Cavaliers games and did sports reporting for WKYC-TV.

Career with the Red Sox
Castiglione joined the Red Sox broadcast team in 1983, teamed with Ken Coleman. He admitted not being in the booth when the ball rolled through Bill Buckner's legs in the 1986 World Series, as he was in the clubhouse covering Red Sox' seemingly impending victory celebration. After Coleman's retirement in 1989, Bob Starr became the lead announcer for the Red Sox.  After Starr's departure at the end of the 1992 season, Castiglione became the team's lead radio announcer along with Jerry Trupiano. Castiglione became nationally known when the team won the 2004 World Series, with his broadcast of the end of the game. His jubilant "Can you believe it?" after the final out became a catchphrase. 

During the 2007 season, Castiglione shared announcing duties with a rotating duo of Dave O'Brien and Glenn Geffner. With Geffner leaving for the Florida Marlins broadcast booth, Castiglione shared the booth with Dave O'Brien, Dale Arnold or Jon Rish in 2008. Dave O'Brien and Jon Rish were his partners from 2009 through April 2013.  In 2011, Dale Arnold returned to be the primary fill in on Wednesday games. Starting in May 2013, Rob Bradford, Lou Merloni and O'Brien were his partners after John Ryder replaced Rish, with Merloni and Bradford stepping in for fill-in play by play duties. In 2011, O'Brien became the lead announcer with Castiglione moving back to the secondary announcing role. Castiglione handled play-by-play in innings 3–4 and 6–7 with O'Brien, and all innings when working with Bradford and Merloni.

In 2016, with O'Brien moving to NESN, the Red Sox television network, Castiglione began working with former Pittsburgh Pirates broadcaster Tim Neverett and once again was the primary game announcer calling innings 1–2, 5 and 8–9 on WEEI. In 2017, Castiglione and Neverett rotated games as the primary and secondary announcers.

On September 20, 2018, as part of a promotion called “A Rivalry in the Booth”, Castiglione switched places with New York Yankees radio broadcaster John Sterling in the fourth inning. During the 2018 American League Championship Series (ALCS), Castiglione reacted to a catch made by Andrew Benintendi made in the ninth inning of Game 4. Castiglione fell out of his chair, and proceeded to finish the commentary with co-commentator Neverett after the incident.

On July 28, 2022, Castiglione was honored in a pregame ceremony at Fenway Park for his 40 years of broadcasting the Red Sox; the ceremony included Roger Clemens presenting Castiglione with a plaque.

For the 2023 season, Castiglione will work a reduced role and only call 81 games as the primary announcer in order to spend more time with his family. He will work with Will Flemming and Sean McDonough as secondary announcers. Castiglione's former broadcast partner Lou Merloni will call remaining regular season games, in addition to 10 spring training games.

Other work
Castiglione has occasionally called college football and college basketball, most notably including games of Lafayette College and the University of Massachusetts-Amherst, where he worked alongside his oldest son, Duke, now with WCVB in Boston.

Castiglione is currently a lecturer in the department of Communication Studies at Northeastern University, where he teaches a course on sports broadcasting. Current Padres play-by-play announcer Don Orsillo and current Red Sox Spanish-language announcer Uri Berenguer were among his students and broadcast booth interns. He has also taught at Franklin Pierce University in New Hampshire.

Books
In 2004, Castiglione published a book called Broadcast Rites and Sites: I Saw It on the Radio with the Boston Red Sox. The book is a collection of stories from his days covering the Cleveland Indians and Boston Red Sox. It was updated in 2006 to include material on the 2004 World Series. In 2012, Castiglione returned to writing with a second book entitled Can You Believe It? 30 Years of Insider Stories with the Boston Red Sox.  In this book, he takes the reader back to the 2004 ALCS with the Yankees and that year's World Series as well as the team's return to glory in 2007.  However, much of the book is about the 30 years that Castiglione spent in the broadcast booth and the personal relationships he built up over that time, woven into the ups and downs in Red Sox history.

References

External links
 MA Broadcasters Association Hall of Fame Bio
 Castiglione on 'Cuse Conversations Podcast

1947 births
Living people
American radio sports announcers
Boston Red Sox announcers
Cleveland Indians announcers
Colgate University alumni
College basketball announcers in the United States
College football announcers
Franklin Pierce University faculty
Major League Baseball broadcasters
Milwaukee Brewers announcers
National Basketball Association broadcasters
Northeastern University faculty
People from Hamden, Connecticut
S.I. Newhouse School of Public Communications alumni